Sir Christopher Keith Curwen,  (9 April 1929 – 18 December 2013) was a British Intelligence officer specialising in South East Asia who was  Head of the  Secret Intelligence Service (MI6) from 1985 to 1989.

Career
Curwen was educated at Sherborne School and Sidney Sussex College, Cambridge after which he was commissioned into the 4th Queen's Own Hussars in 1948, serving in Malaya. He joined SIS in 1952 and was posted to Thailand in 1954 and Vientiane, Laos in 1956. He returned to the service's London headquarters in 1958, had another spell in Bangkok from 1961 and then two years in Kuala Lumpur. He was at one time married to a woman from South-East Asia; they were later divorced.

Curwen spent three years as SIS liaison officer in Washington D.C. from 1968 and was then head of station in Geneva. He was deputy to Sir Colin Figures from 1980 and succeeded him as Chief of the Service in 1985. His tenure was notable for the successful exfiltration from Moscow of the KGB officer and British agent Oleg Gordievsky.

His obituary in The Times noted: "He possessed a romantic patriotism that belied his hard-headed persona."

References

Notes 

 Sir Christopher Curwen entry in Who's Who
 Curwen entry in the Oxford Dictionary of National Biography 

1929 births
2013 deaths
Civil servants in the Cabinet Office
Cold War spies
Knights Commander of the Order of St Michael and St George
People educated at Sherborne School
Alumni of Sidney Sussex College, Cambridge
Chiefs of the Secret Intelligence Service